Jamie Denbo (born July 24, 1973) is an American actress, writer, comedian and half of the comedy duo Ronna and Beverly with Jessica Chaffin. She also co-starred in the FX series Terriers and appeared in Spy, The Heat and Ghostbusters (2016).

Early life
Denbo was born and raised in suburban Boston, in Swampscott, Massachusetts. She is an only child. Her mother is from Montreal, and her father is from New Jersey near Philadelphia; both parents were raised in Orthodox Jewish households. Denbo attended a Jewish day school from kindergarten to sixth grade. Several of her summers were spent at Camp Tel Noar in Hampstead, New Hampshire where she starred as Wendy in Peter Pan and appeared in several other plays.

Denbo attended college at Boston University, where she participated in improvisational comedy.

Career
Early in her career, Denbo performed comedy at the Comedy Warehouse at Disney World's Pleasure Island in Orlando, Florida. She eventually moved to New York City where she began performing at the Upright Citizens Brigade Theater (UCB), where she continues to perform, now at the UCB's Los Angeles division, often performing with her husband John Ross Bowie and her comedy partner Jessica Chaffin. She also teaches classes there. She performed stand-up comedy for Just For Laughs in Montreal and Aspen Comedy Festival. She and Chaffin were slated to star in a comedy film after their success as supporting characters in the comedy feature The Heat.

Denbo was one of the stars of the sitcom Happy Hour, playing the role of Tina Difabio. She also played Susan Jones on the Goodnight Burbank video podcast. On August 5, 2007 she returned as co-anchor on the show. Her pilot Ronna & Beverly (based on the popular stage show she performs with Jessica Chaffin at the UCB) aired as a comedy special on the Showtime network in December 2009. In 2011, Denbo and Chaffin started the Ronna and Beverly comedy podcast where they interview different celebrities each week.

In 2010, she co-starred as Maggie Lefferts on the FX series Terriers. She has frequently appeared in comedy segments on The Late Late Show with Craig Ferguson. She has made guest appearances on Curb Your Enthusiasm, Happy Endings, The Life & Times of Tim, Reno 911!, Suburgatory, Bad Judge, Mike & Molly, Weeds, How I Met Your Mother, Mighty Med, Mulaney, Speechless and The Real O'Neals.

In December 2011, Denbo and Kerri Kenney-Silver made a pilot for Comedy Central called Dame Delilah’s Rabbit Hole Ranch based on a web-series they previously created and starred in. Her screenplay for Best Buds was sold to Vendome Pictures in 2010 with Natalie Portman attached to produce and star. Denbo is also a contributing writer for The Huffington Post.

She is the creator of Lifetime's American Princess which was cancelled after only one season, and the host of Stitcher podcast Beverly in LA.

Podcasts

Ronna and Beverly

Denbo and comedy partner Jessica Chaffin hosted a podcast, Ronna and Beverly, on the Earwolf network from 2011 until 2017 wherein they interviewed celebrity guests, interacted with one another, and dispensed advice to listeners.  Chaffin and Denbo developed their characters in 2006 when they were asked to host an all-Jewish 'Kosher Christmas Show' at the Upright Citizens Brigade Theatre.

Live performances from the pair were frequently advertised as "seminars" in which their characters discuss the fictional book they co-authored, "You'll Do a Little Better Next Time: A Guide to Marriage and Re-marriage for Jewish Singles."  After introducing the book, either Chaffin or Denbo would often add the clarification, "It says Jewish in the name, but it's for everyone!"

Episodes of their eponymous podcast were released every two weeks by Earwolf. Guests included people working in comedy, as well as actors, authors, and filmmakers.  The podcast premiered on May 25, 2011.  In episode 161 on June 15, 2017 (not long after they started teasing the possibility of releasing weekly episodes), Ronna and Beverly suddenly announced they were taking off "for the summer."  Since then, no new episodes have been released and the actresses have not appeared together in character.  Jessica Chaffin has kept Ronna alive by appearing in character as a guest on other podcasts and by maintaining an Instagram account.  On the April 16, 2018 episode of the Why Mommy Drinks podcast, guest Jamie Denbo confirmed that she "used to" have a podcast called Ronna and Beverly, ostensibly indicating the conclusion of the series.

Denbo's daughter, Nola, appeared on several episodes of the podcast as "Spaghettios."  "Spaghettios" is the troubled 8 year old daughter of Beverly's neighbor, Gloria "Spaghetti", whose actual last name Beverly cannot remember, but knows it's "something Italian."

On March 11, 2019 Denbo announced she will be launching a spinoff podcast titled Beverly In LA on Stitcher Premium.

Personal life
Denbo is married to comedy writer and actor John Ross Bowie. They have a daughter, Nola and a son, Walter.

Filmography 

|-
| 2021
| Kevin Can F Himself
| Diane McAntee
| 10 episodes

References

External links

 Jamie Denbo on Twitter

1973 births
Living people
American film actresses
American television actresses
American television writers
American voice actresses
Actresses from Boston
People from Swampscott, Massachusetts
American women comedians
21st-century American actresses
American people of Canadian descent
Jewish American actresses
Boston University alumni
Upright Citizens Brigade Theater performers
Screenwriters from Massachusetts
Writers from Boston
Comedians from Massachusetts
21st-century American comedians
American women television writers
American women podcasters
American podcasters
21st-century American screenwriters
21st-century American Jews